KMGZ (95.3 FM) is a radio station broadcasting a hot adult contemporary format. The station serves the Lawton, Oklahoma area. It appears to be privately owned.  Studios are located in western Lawton, and the transmitter is located southwest of the city.

Translators

References

External links

MGZ